Madar-e-Soleyman is a city in Madar-e-Soleyman Rural District, Hakhamanish District, Pasargad County, Fars Province, Iran. At the 2006 census, its population was 1,633, in 404 families.

References 

Populated places in Pasargad County
Cities in Fars Province